Agyneta propria is a species of sheet weaver found in Ecuador. It was described by Millidge in 1991.

References

propria
Spiders described in 1991
Spiders of South America
Invertebrates of Ecuador